Samuel Paul Perry (born 29 December 2001) is an English professional footballer who plays as a midfielder for  club Leamington on loan from Walsall.

Career
Born in Walsall, Perry started his career at the academy of Aston Villa before joining Walsall in 2019. He made his debut for Walsall on 7 January 2020 in a 2–1 EFL Trophy defeat at home to Portsmouth. He was offered his first professional contract in May 2020, which he signed in July of that year. He made his league debut for Walsall on 27 February 2021, starting in a 2–1 League Two defeat at home to Bradford City. He scored the first goal of his career the following month with a weak-footed half-volley into the bottom right corner in the 28th minute of a 2–1 defeat away to Bolton Wanderers on 20 March 2021. On 12 April 2021, he signed a new contract with the club of undisclosed length. He made 16 appearances across the 2020–21 season, scoring one goal.

On 12 July 2022, Perry joined National League side Yeovil Town on loan until the end of the 2022–23 season. 

On 3 February 2023, Perry joined National League North side Leamington on loan until the end of the 2022–23 season.

Career statistics

References

External links
 
 
 

2001 births
Living people
English footballers
Sportspeople from Walsall
Association football midfielders
Aston Villa F.C. players
Walsall F.C. players
Yeovil Town F.C. players
Leamington F.C. players
English Football League players
National League (English football) players